The volcano swiftlet (Aerodramus vulcanorum or Collocalia vulcanorum) is a species of bird in the family Apodidae formerly considered conspecific with the Himalayan swiftlet (Aerodramus brevirostris). It is endemic to several sites in western Java in Indonesia.

Habitat
Aerodramus vulcanorum nests in rock crevices at 1000 to 3,000m above sea level. It forages around peaks and ridges of volcanoes and over hilly primary forest. All known breeding sites are on active volcanoes. the active elevation range of this species plays a major role in where it lives.

References

volcano swiftlet
Birds of Java
volcano swiftlet